Donavon Smallwood (born 1994) is an American photographer, living in New York City. His first book is Languor (2021).

Life and work
Smallwood was born, grew up and continues to live in Harlem, New York City. He studied documentary film and English literature at Hunter College in New York.

Languor (2021) is a book of portraits of people and photographs of nature made in Central Park, Manhattan during the COVID-19 pandemic, using a medium format film camera. Smallwood says "Its subject is what it's like to be a black person in nature." In 2021 the book won the Aperture Portfolio Prize and the work was exhibitied at the Camera Club of New York and as part of the Taylor Wessing Photographic Portrait Prize in London.

Publications
Languor. Trespasser, 2021. . Edition of 1500 copies.

References

External links

21st-century American photographers
Photographers from New York City
Portrait photographers
African-American photographers
Hunter College alumni
21st-century African-American people
People from East Harlem
Living people
1994 births